Moreshwar Save (1931 – 16 July 2015) was an Indian politician who was a leader of Shiv Sena and a member of the Lok Sabha elected from Aurangabad. He was member of the 9th and 10th Lok Sabha. He also served as mayor of Aurangabad in 1989–1990.

References

Shiv Sena politicians
1931 births
India MPs 1989–1991
India MPs 1991–1996
Lok Sabha members from Maharashtra
2015 deaths
People from Aurangabad, Maharashtra
People from Marathwada
Maharashtra municipal councillors
Mayors of places in Maharashtra
Marathi politicians